Chmielewo may refer to the following places:
Chmielewo, Kuyavian-Pomeranian Voivodeship (north-central Poland)
Chmielewo, Kolno County in Podlaskie Voivodeship (north-east Poland)
Chmielewo, Łomża County in Podlaskie Voivodeship (north-east Poland)
Chmielewo, Gmina Stary Lubotyń in Masovian Voivodeship (east-central Poland)
Chmielewo, Gmina Zaręby Kościelne in Masovian Voivodeship (east-central Poland)
Chmielewo, Płock County in Masovian Voivodeship (east-central Poland)
Chmielewo, Gmina Pułtusk in Masovian Voivodeship (east-central Poland)
Chmielewo, Gmina Świercze in Masovian Voivodeship (east-central Poland)
Chmielewo, Greater Poland Voivodeship (west-central Poland)
Chmielewo, Giżycko County in Warmian-Masurian Voivodeship (north Poland)
Chmielewo, Pisz County in Warmian-Masurian Voivodeship (north Poland)
Chmielewo, West Pomeranian Voivodeship (north-west Poland)
Chmielewo, Zhabinka district of the Brest region (west Belarus)